Manki  is a village situated in the Deoband Mandal of Saharanpur District in the state of Uttar Pradesh. Manki is known for GADA  Biradri or GAUR. It is also famous for ancient Shiv Mandir (Shivalay). Manki is famous for its hospitality. Every year bhole come from different part of country stay there at Shiv Mandir and the go to Haridwar for taking holly bath. Every Monday in srawan month , a festival is organised at Shiv Mandir and people from across the country join this festival.

Villages nearby include Talheri Khurd, Miragpur, Sanpla Bakkal, Dugchari Malakpur, Bibipur, Sadharanapur and Salhapur.

References
Garha

Gaur Rajput

Gaur Brahmins

Villages in Saharanpur district